Aimee Semple McPherson (née Kennedy; October 9, 1890 – September 27, 1944), also known as Sister Aimee or Sister, was a Canadian Pentecostal evangelist and media celebrity.  Early in the itinerant phase of her career, she discovered that if she prayed over sick people, many of them stated they got well.  Consequently, she began holding what she termed as "divine healing" revival sessions. These outdoor, open-air demonstrations drew many thousands of people.  As a result, she not only became known by the news media and the public as a dynamic revivalist, but also a sought after faith healer. Those who have been converted and healed saw nothing dubious in their curative experience.  Critics, on the other hand, said healings were mesmerism or hypnotism and even "crimes committed in the name of religion."  Reporters attended the revival services and wrote of her seeming ability to heal the sick and infirm; and some news articles included even names and addresses of those who stated healing.

Early life

McPherson said she experienced several of her own personal faith healing incidents. One occurred in 1909, when her broken foot was mended, an event that served to introduce her to the possibilities of the healing power of faith. Another was an unexpected recovery from an operation in 1914, where hospital staff expected her to die. In 1916, before a gathered revival tent crowd, Aimee experienced swift rejuvenation of blistered skin from a serious flash burn caused by a lamp that had exploded in her face.

In 1919, after her husband Harold left McPherson's itinerant revival tours for a more stable life, Mildred Kennedy, McPherson's mother, and both her children, Roberta and Rolf joined her. According to Kennedy the crowds at the revivals were easily twice as large as McPherson reported in her letters and the healings were not optimistic exaggerations. Kennedy said she witnessed visible cancers disappear, the deaf hear, the blind see, and the disabled walk.

Career 
McPherson's first reported successful public faith healing session of another person was in Corona, New York, on Long Island, in 1916. A young woman in the advanced stages of rheumatoid arthritis was brought to the altar by friends just as McPherson preached "Jesus Christ is the same yesterday, today and forever". McPherson laid hands upon the woman's head, and the woman was able to leave the church that night without crutches.

Spreckels Organ Pavillion (1921) 
In late January 1921 McPherson conducted a healing ceremony at the Spreckels Organ Pavilion in Balboa Park in San Diego, California. Police, U.S. Marines, and Army personnel helped manage traffic and the estimated 30,000 people who attended. She had to move to the outdoor site after the audience grew too large for the  3,000 seat Dreamland Boxing Arena.

During the engagement, a woman paralyzed from the waist down from was presented for faith healing. McPherson feared she would be run out of town if this healing did not manifest, due to previous demonstrations that had occurred at smaller events of hers. McPherson prayed and laid hands on her, and the woman got up out of her wheelchair and walked. Other unwell persons came to the platform McPherson occupied, though not all were cured.

Due to the demand for her services, her stay was extended. McPherson prayed for hours without food or stopping for a break. At the end of the day, she was taken away by her staff, dehydrated and unsteady with fatigue. McPherson wrote of the day, “As soon as one was healed, she ran and told nine others, and brought them too, even telegraphing and rushing the sick on trains".  Originally planned for two weeks in the evenings, McPherson's Balboa Park revival meetings lasted over five weeks and went from dawn until dusk.

1921–1922 
At a revival meeting in August 1921, in San Francisco, journalists posing as scientific investigators diverted healing claimants as they descended from the platform and "cross-examined as to the genuineness of the cure.”   Concurrently, a group of doctors from the American Medical Association in San Francisco secretly investigated some of McPherson's local revival meetings. The subsequent AMA report stated McPherson's healing was "genuine, beneficial and wonderful". This also was the tone of press clippings, testimonials, and private correspondence in regards to the healings. 

In 1921 during the Denver campaign, a Serbian Romani tribe chief, Dewy Mark and his mother stated they were faith-healed by McPherson of a respiratory illness and a "fibroid tumor." For the next year the Romani king, by letter and telegram urged all other Romani to follow McPherson and "her wonderful Lord Jesus." Thousands of others from the Mark and Mitchell tribes came to her in caravans from all over the country and were converted with healings being reported from a number of them. Funds in gold, taken from necklaces, other jewlery, and elsewhere, were given by Romani in gratitude and helped fund the construction of the new Angelus Temple. She had the support of thousands and hundreds attended regularly services at the newly built Angeles Temple in Los Angeles.  The Romani followed her to a revival gathering in Wichita, Kansas, and on May 29, 1922, heavy perennial thunderstorms threatened to rain out the thousands who gathered there listening to other ministers. McPherson interrupted the speaker, raised her hand to the sky, and prayed, "if the land hath need of it, let it fall (the rain) after the message has been delivered to these hungry souls". To the crowd's surprise, the rain immediately stopped and many believed they witnessed a miracle. The event was reported the following day by the Wichita Eagle. For the gathered Romani, it was a further acknowledgement "of the woman's power". Up until that time, the Romani in the United States were largely unreached by Christianity. The infusion of crosses and other symbols of Christianity alongside Romani astrology charts and crystal balls was the result of McPherson's influence.

In 1922, McPherson returned for a second tour in the Great Revival of Denver and asked about people who have stated healings from the previous visit. Seventeen people, some well-known members of the community, testified, giving credence to the audience of her belief that "healing still occurred among modern Christians".

Legal Troubles 
McPherson was the subject of over 45 lawsuits over her lifetime, including those involving her assistant pastor Rheba Crawford Splivalo and her own daughter Roberta Star Semple along with faking her own kidnapping, the latter of which charges were dropped for lack of evidence.

In 1928, when two clergymen were preaching against her and what she termed "divine healing," McPherson's staff assembled thousands of documents and attached to each of them photos, medical certificates, X-rays, and testimonies of healing. The information gathered were used to silence the clergymens' accusations and also were accessed by some later McPherson biographers.

Later life 
In later years, McPherson identified other individuals with a faith healing gift. During Wednesday and Saturday divine healing sessions she worked among them or was even absent altogether. Over time she mostly withdrew from the faith healing aspect of her services, since it was overwhelming other areas of her ministry.

Scheduled healing sessions nevertheless remained highly popular with the public until her death in 1944.  One of these was Stretcher Day, which was held behind the Angeles Temple parsonage once every month to six weeks.  It was for the most serious of the infirm who could only be moved by "stretcher."  Ambulances would arrive at the parsonage and McPherson would enter, greet the patient and pray over them.  On Stretcher Day, so many ambulances were in demand that Los Angeles area hospitals and medical centers had to make it a point of reserving a few for other needs and emergencies.

Views on McPherson's faith healing 
McPherson's faith-healing demonstrations were extensively covered in the news media and were a large part of her early career legacy. James Robinson, an author on Pentecostalism, diverse healing and holiness traditions; writes: "In terms of results, the healings associated with her were among the most impressive in late modern history.”

In April 1920, a Washington Times reporter conveyed that for McPherson's work to be a hoax on such a grand scale was inconceivable, communicating that the healings were occurring more rapidly than he could record them. To help verify the testimonies, as per his editor, the reporter took names and addresses of those he saw and with whom he spoke. Documentation, including news articles, letters, and testimonials indicated sick people came to her by the tens of thousands. According to these sources, some healings were only temporary, while others lasted throughout people's lives.

Later in 1921 a survey was sent out by First Baptist Church Pastor William Keeney Towner in San Jose, California, to 3,300 people to investigate McPherson's healing services. 2500 persons responded. Six percent indicated they were immediately and completely healed while 85 percent indicated they were partially healed and continued to improve ever since. Fewer than half of 1 percent did not feel they were at least spiritually uplifted and had their faith strengthened.

Denver Post reporter Frances Wayne wrote that while McPherson's "attack" on sin was "uncultured,...the deaf heard, the blind saw, the paralytic walked, the palsied became calm, before the eyes of as many people that could be packed into the largest church auditorium in Denver".

In 1921, when some members of Lodi California's First Congregational Church returned and talked enthusiastically of healings and conversions at McPherson's tent revival meeting in San Jose California, Oxford educated Pastor Charles S. Price (1887–1947), believed what they underwent was "metaphysical, psychological, nothing tangible,” and "they had been inoculated with a strange serum, had “gotten the hallelujahs.” He went to San Jose to learn how to “straighten them out.”  Skeptical at first, Price was eventually persuaded by McPherson who “won more people to Jesus Christ in one afternoon” than he could recall in fourteen years of ministry. He became her assistant and starting in 1922 went on to preach as a traveling evangelist who converted tens of thousands along with many instances of miraculous divine healings that were stated to have occurred.

Although he was an atheist, Charles Chaplin discretely enjoyed listening to McPherson's Sunday night illustrated sermons.   He was astounded by the healings he saw in her services. He thought they might have been a combination of McPherson's skilled hypnotism and the power she commanded over the crowds

In Canton, OH, October 1921, crowds filled the city's auditorium, and many people who were carried to the platform for prayer walked away unassisted. Crutches and braces were left behind while the blind stated they could see and the deaf could hear.  Though six local ministers concurred that the work was a "genuine manifestation of God to fulfill his promises," three others did not commit and P.H. Welshimer of First Christian Church, a congregation of 6,000 members, stated the healings were the result of hypnotism and "mesmeric power." According to a church publication, Psychologist and hypnotist, professor D. H. Deamude, who was in town during the Canton, OH revival campaign, stated, based on his expertise; whatever McPherson was doing, hypnotism could not account for it.

Actor Anthony Quinn, who for a time played in the church's band and was an apprentice preacher, in this partial quote, recalls a service:

Biographer Daniel Mark Epstein wrote that described incidents of miraculous faith healing are sometimes clinically explained as a result of hysteria or a form of hypnosis. Strong emotions and the mind's ability to trigger the production of opiates, endorphins, and enkephalins have also been offered as explanations, as well as the suggestion that the healings were simply faked.

In an interview with the Baltimore Sun, Epstein said:

Years later, Epstein interviewed Rolf McPherson, his mother's appointed successor who spoke of the period: "more patients were open to the possibilities of faith healing."  Next to him, mounted on his office wall; was a hand tinted photo enlargement of his mother helping a woman out her wheelchair in Balboa Park.  He speculated that healings occurred because they had more faith in God and less in science, and he could not "imagine this sort of thing happening again."

After McPherson's death, LIFE Magazine wrote that, "her vast popularity in derived in part from the skill with which she applied theatrical techniques to the art of homiletics".

Personal Views
When McPherson retired after a long and exhausting faith healing service, she would sometimes suffer from insomnia, a problem she would contend with for the rest of her life.

She did not abstain from visiting doctors or using medicine to treat her own illnesses.

When traveling abroad, she paid scrupulous attention to sanitation, concerned that a careless oversight might result in acquiring an exotic disease.

When asked by a journalist about her demonstrations, McPherson said, "the saving of souls is the most important part of my ministry."

Religious Views 
McPherson considered each faith healing incident a sacred gift from God, the glory of Jesus Christ, passed through her to persons healed and not to be taken for granted.

Divine healing, in her view, was a church sacrament rather than entertainment. In her own writings and sermons, McPherson did not referred to divine healing as being accessible by faith and devotion. McPherson disliked being given credit for the healings, considering herself the medium through which the power flows, the power of Christ working the cure.

References

Notes

Citations

Further reading
 

Aimee Semple McPherson
Faith healers